Liu Jiayu (born 17 September 1992 in Hegang) is a Chinese snowboarder whose specialization is the half-pipe. She has six World Cup Victories and a halfpipe victory at the FIS Snowboarding World Championships 2009. She began snowboarding in 2003, switching over from martial arts at the relatively late age of 11. Liu competed for China at the 2010, 2014, and 2018 Winter Olympics, where she achieved 4th, 9th, and 2nd place, respectively.

Liu is from Hegang but moved to Harbin for winter sports training. Her nickname is Birdie.

References

External links
 
 
 
 
 

Chinese female snowboarders
Snowboarders at the 2010 Winter Olympics
Snowboarders at the 2014 Winter Olympics
Snowboarders at the 2018 Winter Olympics
Snowboarders at the 2022 Winter Olympics
1992 births
Living people
People from Hegang
Olympic snowboarders of China
Sportspeople from Heilongjiang
Asian Games medalists in snowboarding
Snowboarders at the 2007 Asian Winter Games
Snowboarders at the 2017 Asian Winter Games
Asian Games gold medalists for China
Asian Games bronze medalists for China
Medalists at the 2007 Asian Winter Games
Medalists at the 2017 Asian Winter Games
Universiade medalists in snowboarding
Medalists at the 2018 Winter Olympics
Olympic silver medalists for China
Olympic medalists in snowboarding
Universiade gold medalists for China
Competitors at the 2009 Winter Universiade
21st-century Chinese women